The December 2009 Midwest blizzard was a powerful extratropical cyclone which was of a category which meteorologists refer to as a cyclogenic bomb, a system which shows a drop in central pressure similar to the rapid intensification cycle of a tropical cyclone, more than 1 mbar (approx. 0.03 inHg) per hour for 12 to 24 hours or more. A sustained drop averaging more than 2.5 mbar/h is termed explosive deepening/intensification, and this was the case with this rapidly deepening and intensifying storm as it traversed the Midwest and Ontario and on to Québec, Greenland and vicinity. In many locations wind, snowfall, and precipitation moisture content records dating back to the December 2, 1990 storm, the 1976-1978 period, the 1949 blizzard, or even further back were broken, with barometric pressure records falling as well. Both the central pressure (depth) and rate of change and differential over a given distance (intensity) were remarkable, and both caused hurricane-force winds in places.

The storm originated over the south-western United States west of the Rocky Mountains on December 6, 2009, and took a common winter storms track known as the [Oklahoma] Panhandle Track. Rapid to explosive intensification took place over a period of more than 36 hours as the system regrouped over the southern Great Plains, with the central pressure bottoming out at 976 mbar (97.6 kPa or 28.81 inHg) on the morning of December 9 over northern lower Michigan although readings as low as 969 mbar (96.9 kPa or 28.61 inHg) were reported in the region by co-operative observers and others. This central pressure was lower than the storm which sank the Edmund Fitzgerald on November 10, 1975, and equivalent to a Category 2 hurricane.

In advance of the storm, the barometric pressure at many weather stations fell by 3 or more millibars per hour for 18 hours or more. Several locations along the path of the storm reported winds in excess of 100 mph with a 115 mph gust in north-eastern New Mexico. In spite of this, the largest snow drifts created by the storm in the Midwest were some in Iowa which approached  in height.

In some localities, the moisture content of the precipitation from the storm exceeded .  This was probably part of the reason that the section of the snowpack generated by this storm persisted into late April 2010 in some locations.

Lightning, thunder, rain, granular snow, ice pellets, graupel, hail, blowing dust, and freezing rain were also elements of this storm in different locations, which the National Weather Service in Des Moines, Iowa called an "epic" blizzard in its December 7, 2009 issuance of a Blizzard Warning for essentially its entire County Warning Area.

Thunderstorms and lake-effect snow bands increased the totals in some places, including locations where the lake effect was able to be discerned more than 100 miles inland.

Fog of the advection, frontal, and evaporation (steam) species—often occurring in combination—accompanied the snow in many localities, in some cases turning to freezing fog before lifting; some stations reported a very unusual simultaneous combination of heavy snow or mixed precipitation, lightning, dense fog, and winds in excess of 50 mph.

The storm picked up forward speed as it entered South Central Canada, the clouds and precipitation appearing to travel in excess of 100 mph over central and north-east Canada and the North Atlantic Ocean. As in a case in December 1986 when the precipitation shield of a snow storm was confirmed to be traveling at 125 mph over Missouri, Kansas, and Iowa and with some species of synoptic scale dust storms and some cold fronts which also can attain forward speeds of up to 110 mph or more, the system hooked into an area of fast-moving upper-level winds and/or a strong jet stream. This setup allowed a great deal of convection not often seen at the ambient temperatures during this storm's cyclogenesis, reorganisation, and movement to the north-east to take place during most of the lifetime of the system.

The storm was the largest wind producer for the region since Hurricane Ike reintensified and regained partial tropical characteristics over Indiana and Michigan.

References

Midwest Blizzard, 2009